Belgrade Rugby Club Red Star, (Serbian: Београдски рагби клуб Црвена звезда), is a rugby union team from Belgrade, Serbia. The club is a member of the Rugby Union of Serbia. The club is also member of the Red Star Sports Society (Sportsko Drustvo Crvena Zvezda). The team wears a red and white strip.

History 
The original Belgrade Rugby Club (BRK) was founded on 20 December 1982. The team colours were blue and white and the logo featured a sparrow (Dživdžan). In the early 1990s the club was renamed the Royal Belgrade Rugby Club (KBRK) with the patronage of Prince Alexander II Karađorđević. The team's colours became yellow, brown, and white and the sparrow was replaced by a crown. As KBRK, the club was successful in the nineties and noughties. 

In 2012 the club's executive committee decided to return to the name of BRK. The word Royal was removed from the club's name, the colours were reverted to blue and white and a re-styled sparrow replaced the crown. In 2014, the Belgrade Rugby Club (BRK) became Belgrade Rugby Club Red Star (BRK Crvena Zvezda) or BRK Red Star.

A group of former BRK-KBRK members and players were unhappy with this change and, led by Danijem Stricevicem, decided to split away. A new club was formed under the Royal Belgrade Rugby Club (KBRK) name in 2014.

Club honours
In total, the club has won 2 National Championships and 3 National Cups:  

BELGRADE RUGBY CLUB RED STAR (2014–)
Rugby Championship of Serbia:
Winners (2):  2015, 2016

Rugby Cup of Serbia:
Winners (2): 2014, 2016

ROYAL BELGRADE RUGBY CLUB (1994–2012):
Rugby Championship of SR Yugoslavia:
Winners (1):  1995
Rugby Cup of Serbia:
Winners (2):  2004, 2010

Current squad 

Senior Squad:  

  Vladimir Ambrus
  Andrej Banduka
  Bojan Belic
  Petar Vasic
  Aleksandar Madjanovic
  Andrija Jankovic
  Andrija Panic
  Nikola Arsic
  Aleksandar Djordjevic
  Danijel Kajan
  Aleksandar Nedeljkovic
  Vitor Ljubicic
  Ivan Rodic
  Vlastimir Sretenovic
  Marko Jacimovic
  Marko Joksimovic
  Vedran Brkic
  Dejan Karatrajovski

External links 
 brkcrvenazvezda.com BRK Red Star official site

References

Crvena zvezda
Serbian rugby union teams
Rugby clubs established in 1982
1982 establishments in Yugoslavia